Filippovka is a rural locality (a selo) in Kadyrgulovsky Selsoviet, Davlekanovsky District, Bashkortostan, Russia. The population was 49 as of 2010. There are 3 streets.

Geography 
Filippovka is located 39 km southeast of Davlekanovo (the district's administrative centre) by road. Usmanovo is the nearest rural locality.

References 

Rural localities in Davlekanovsky District